Damango is one of the constituencies represented in the Parliament of Ghana. It elects one Member of Parliament (MP) by the first past the post system of election. The Damango constituency is located in the West Gonja District of the Savannah Region  of Ghana.

Boundaries 
The seat is located entirely within the  West Gonja District of the Savannah Region of Ghana.

Members of Parliament

See also
List of Ghana Parliament constituencies
List of political parties in Ghana

References

Parliamentary constituencies in the Savannah  Region